Rockwell was a town in Adams County, Washington. The GNIS classifies it as a populated place.

The community was named for the nature of the county and a well dug into rock near the town site.

References

Ghost towns in Washington (state)
Geography of Adams County, Washington